Anthony T. Manero (April 4, 1905 – October 22, 1989) was an American professional golfer. He won eight times on the PGA Tour including one major championship, the 1936 U.S. Open. He played on the 1937 Ryder Cup team. He was born in New York City and died at age 84 in Greenwich, Connecticut.

Professional wins

PGA Tour wins (8)
1929 (1) Catalina Open
1930 (3) Glens Falls Open, Catalina Open, Pasadena Open
1932 (1) Westchester Open
1935 (1) General Brock Hotel Open
1936 (1) U.S. Open
1938 (1) Glens Falls Open

Major championship is shown in bold.

Other wins
(this list may be incomplete)
1934 Carolinas Open
1937 Carolinas Open, New Hampshire Open
1939 New Hampshire Open (tie with John Thoren)
1941 New Hampshire Open
1948 Westchester Open

Major championships

Wins (1)

Results timeline

NYF = tournament not yet founded
NT = no tournament
WD = withdrew
CUT = missed the half-way cut
R64, R32, R16, QF, SF =round in which player lost in PGA Championship match play
"T" indicates a tie for a place

Summary

Most consecutive cuts made – 9 (1938 Masters – 1941 Masters)
Longest streak of top-10s – 3 (1935 PGA – 1936 PGA)

References

External links 
Image of Tony Manero during a golf tournament, Los Angeles, 1929. Los Angeles Times Photographic Archive (Collection 1429). UCLA Library Special Collections, Charles E. Young Research Library, University of California, Los Angeles.

American male golfers
PGA Tour golfers
Ryder Cup competitors for the United States
Winners of men's major golf championships
Golfers from New York (state)
Sportspeople from New York City
1905 births
1989 deaths